Stunt Pilot is a steel roller coaster at Silverwood Theme Park in Athol, Idaho. The single-rail Raptor model was manufactured by Rocky Mountain Construction, who is headquartered 20 minutes south of the park. Its stunt pilot theme pays homage to the daily air shows that were once hosted at the park from 1988 to 1996. Stunt Pilot opened to the public on May 29, 2021.

History

Rocky Mountain Construction (RMC) was originally hired by Kentucky Kingdom amusement park to design and manufacture a single-rail roller coaster in time for the park's 2021 season. Permits were filed with the FAA, which were uncovered by the public in June 2020 following a series of intentional leaks by the park on social media. As a result of the COVID-19 pandemic, however, Kentucky Kingdom backed out of the project, and its FAA filing was officially withdrawn in December 2020.

After development stalled at Kentucky Kingdom stalled, Silverwood Theme Park picked up the project, and began teasing a similar attraction through social media on September 3, 2020. The single-rail coaster was unveiled as Stunt Pilot on September 17, 2020, with its aerobatics theme meant to commemorate Silverwood's aviation history and daily air shows that were once on display from 1988 to 1996. The park is located on the former Henley Aerodrome airfield. Daily air shows ended following a fatal crash during an air show at Fairchild Air Force Base on September 15, 1996.

Construction of the new ride began in early 2021, with sections of track arrived in February 2021. The first piece was installed on March 4, 2021, and the final track piece was placed on May 3, 2021. By mid-May, the coaster had performed its first test runs. The ride opened on May 29, 2021.

Ride experience

Layout
The ride begins by exiting the station and immediately ascending the  chain lift hill. It enters a dive loop and rises up an airtime hill, followed by an ascending, banked turnaround, where it proceeds into a hairpin turn to the left. The train drops and immediately traverses a cutback followed by a corkscrew. The finale features a quick dip into an over-banked turn and ends with a slight uphill popup into the brake run.

Model
Stunt Pilot is a Raptor coaster from Rocky Mountain Construction, a local roller coaster firm based in Hayden, Idaho. The company had previously worked with Silverwood to install and test their then-prototype "topper track" system on nearly 700 feet of Tremors in 2010. The coaster uses a monorail-esque track system that lets the train run along a single 15.5" thick rail.

Trains
Stunt Pilot features ten-passenger trains, unlike the trains of similar models RailBlazer at California's Great America and Wonder Woman Golden Lasso Coaster at Six Flags Fiesta Texas which hold only 8 passengers. Riders are seated in ten rows with one per row.

Gallery

References

External links
 Stunt Pilot Roller Coaster
 

Roller coasters introduced in 2021
Buildings and structures in Kootenai County, Idaho
Roller coasters in Idaho
Roller coasters manufactured by Rocky Mountain Construction
2021 establishments in Idaho